"Sheba" is a single by musician Mike Oldfield, released in 1980.  It is from the album QE2.  In many countries the Shadows cover, "Wonderful Land", was the A-side, while the B-side was "Sheba".

Vocals on "Sheba" were performed by Maggie Reilly, and drum parts were played by Phil Collins; Oldfield plays all other instruments. The lyrics to "Sheba" are simply vocalisations set to the backing track.

"Wonderful Land" is an instrumental, and is a cover, originally released as a single by The Shadows in 1962.

Track listing 
 "Sheba" – 3:33
 "Wonderful Land" (edit) – 2:50

"Wonderful Land" video 
The video for "Wonderful Land" again shows Oldfield playing various instruments, including a violin, which he has claimed not to be able to play very well. The video is available on the Elements – The Best of Mike Oldfield video.

References 

1980 singles
Mike Oldfield songs
Songs written by Mike Oldfield
Virgin Records singles
1980 songs